Joseph Pardo may refer to:

 Joseph Pardo (hazzan) (c. 1624–1677), English hazzan
 Joseph Pardo (rabbi) (c. 1561–1619), Italian rabbi and merchant

See also
 José Pardo (disambiguation)